The foreign relations of the State of Palestine have been conducted since the establishment of the Palestine Liberation Organization (PLO) in 1964.  In November 1988, the PLO's Palestinian National Council declared the independence of the State of Palestine and in 1994 the PLO established the Palestinian National Authority (PNA) following the Oslo Accords. The PLO Executive Committee performs the functions of the government of the State of Palestine. Currently, the PLO maintains a network of offices in foreign countries and also represents the PNA abroad.

After 2011, the PLO's  diplomatic effort focused on the Palestine 194 campaign, which aims to gain membership for the State of Palestine in the United Nations. It seeks to effectively gain collective recognition for a Palestinian state based on the 1967 borders, with East Jerusalem as its capital.

Background
The Palestine Liberation Organization was created in 1964 as a paramilitary organization and has sought to conduct foreign relations with states and international organisations since that time. Initially, the PLO established relations with Arab and communist countries. In 1969 the PLO became a member of the Organisation of Islamic Cooperation. In October 1974, the Arab League designated the PLO as the "sole legitimate representative of the Palestinian people". The new status of the PLO was recognised by all Arab League states except Jordan (Jordan recognised that status of the PLO at a later stage). On 22 November 1974, United Nations General Assembly Resolution 3236 recognised the right of the Palestinian people to self-determination, national independence, and sovereignty in Palestine. It also recognised the PLO as the representative of the Palestinian people to the United Nations. By Resolution 3237 on the same date, the PLO was granted non-State observer status at the United Nations. In September 1976, the PLO became a non-state member of the Arab League, and in the same year became a member of the Non-Aligned Movement.

On 15 November 1988, in support of the First Intifada, the PLO declared the establishment of the State of Palestine, which was widely recognised by many foreign governments, although often statements made were of an equivocal nature – at times referring to the PLO or the State of Palestine or one acting on behalf of the another, or by the generic "Palestine". Many countries and organisations "upgraded" representation from the PLO to the new State, though in practice the same PLO offices, personnel and contacts continued to be used. In February 1989 at the United Nations Security Council, the PLO representative claimed recognition from 94 states. Since then, additional states have publicly extended recognition.

The PNA was established by the PLO in 1994 following the Oslo Accords and the Israeli-Palestinian Interim Agreement. The Israeli government transferred certain powers and responsibilities of self-government to the PNA, which are in effect in parts of the West Bank, and used to be effective in the Gaza Strip before its takeover by Hamas. The Foreign Affairs Minister of the Palestinian National Authority, who since July 2007 has been Riyad Al-Maliki, is responsible for the foreign relations of the PNA. States maintain official relations with the PNA through offices in the Palestinian territories, and the representation of the PNA abroad is accomplished by the missions of the PLO, who represents it there.

Both the PLO (representing itself, the State of Palestine, or the PNA) and the PNA now maintain an extensive network of diplomatic relations, and participate in multiple international organisations with status of member state, observer, associate, or affiliate. The designation "Palestine", adopted in 1988 by the UN for the PLO, is currently also used as reference to the PNA and the State of Palestine by states and international organisations, in many cases regardless of the level of recognition and relations they have with any of these entities.

Bilateral relations 

The PLO maintains a network of missions and embassies, and represents the PNA abroad. Most of the  have elevated the PLO representation in their country to the status of embassy. A number of other states have granted some form of diplomatic status to a PLO delegation, falling short of full diplomatic recognition. In some cases, as a matter of courtesy, these delegations and missions have been granted diplomatic privileges, and are often referred to as "embassies" with their heads as "ambassadors".

In the United States, an unofficial PLO information office was established in New York in 1964 and run by Sadat Hassan, who served as Permanent Representative of Yemen to the United Nations. The Palestine Information Office was then registered with the Justice Department as a foreign agent and operated until 1968, when it was closed. The PLO was designated a terrorist organization by the United States in 1987, but in 1988 a presidential waiver was issued which permitted contact with the organization. A PLO office was reopened in 1989 as the Palestine Affairs Center. The PLO Mission office, in Washington D.C., was opened in 1994, and represented the PLO in the United States. On 20 July 2010, the United States Department of State agreed to upgrade the status of the PLO Mission in the United States to "General Delegation of the PLO".

States that recognise the State of Palestine accredit to the PLO (acting as its government-in-exile) non-resident ambassadors residing in third countries. Representation of foreign countries to the PNA is performed by missions or offices in Ramallah and Gaza.

Alphabetical table of relations 
A total of 115 states  have diplomatic relations with Palestine

Africa

Americas

Asia

Europe

Oceania / Pacific

Relations with international organisations 
The Palestine Liberation Organization and the Palestinian National Authority are represented in various international organizations as member, associate or observer. Because of inconclusiveness in sources, in some cases it is impossible to distinguish whether the participation is executed by the PLO as representative of the Palestinian state, the PLO as a non-state entity, or the PNA. Often, the designation by the international organisation is usually simply with "Palestine".

Arab League 
In 1964, the first summit of the League of Arab States, held in Cairo in January, resulted in a mandate for the creation of a Palestinian entity. Subsequently, in May, the Palestine Liberation Organization was established during a meeting of the Palestinian National Congress in Arab-controlled Jerusalem. The organisation's establishment was formally approved at the Arab League's second summit, held in Alexandria in October. The PLO was granted full membership in 1976. Its seat was assumed by the State of Palestine following the declaration of independence in 1988.

Organisation of Islamic Cooperation 
The PLO was accorded full membership in the Organisation of the Islamic Conference (OIC; now named Organisation of Islamic Cooperation) in 1969; it attended the founding conference, held in Rabat in September 1969, as an observer. Its seat was assumed by the State of Palestine following the declaration of independence in 1988. It is also a member of the Islamic Development Bank, an international financial institution for member states of the OIC.

Status at the United Nations 

The Palestine National Council (PNC) sent formal notification to the U.N. Secretary-General regarding the establishment of the Palestine Liberation Organization (PLO) in May 1964. The following year in October, some Arab states requested that a PLO delegation be allowed to attend meetings of the Special Political Committee, and it was decided that they could present a statement, without implying recognition. PLO participation in the discussions of the Committee took place under the agenda item of the United Nations Relief and Works Agency for Palestine Refugees in the Near East (UNRWA) from 1963 to 1973.

The Palestine Liberation Organization was granted observer status at the United Nations General Assembly in 1974 through General Assembly Resolution 3237. In the UNGA's regional groupings, the PLO gained full membership in the Group of Asian states on 2 April 1986. Acknowledging the proclamation of the State of Palestine, the UN re-designated this observer to be referred to as "Palestine" in 1988 (General Assembly Resolution 43/177) and affirmed "the need to enable the Palestinian people to exercise their sovereignty over their territory occupied since 1967". In July 1998, the General Assembly adopted a new Resolution (52/250) conferring upon Palestine additional rights and privileges, including the right to participate in the general debate held at the start of each session of the General Assembly, the right of reply, the right to co-sponsor resolutions and the right to raise points of order on Palestinian and Middle East issues. By this resolution, "seating for Palestine shall be arranged immediately after non-member States and before the other observers." This Resolution was adopted by a vote of 124 in favour, 4 against (Israel, Marshall Islands, Federated States of Micronesia, United States) and 10 abstentions.

Since 2011, Palestinian diplomacy has been centred around the Palestine 194 campaign, which aims to gain membership for the State of Palestine in the United Nations at its 66th Session in September 2011. It seeks to effectively gain collective recognition for a Palestinian state based on the borders prior to the Six-Day War, with East Jerusalem as its capital. In September 2012, the Palestine Liberation Organization submitted a draft resolution according non-member observer state status to Palestine, which the General Assembly approved on 29 November 2012. The change in status was described by The Independent as "de facto recognition of the sovereign State of Palestine".

The vote was a historic benchmark for the sovereign State of Palestine and its citizens, whilst it was a diplomatic setback for Israel and the United States. Status as an observer state in the UN will allow the State of Palestine to join treaties and specialised UN agencies, such as the International Civil Aviation Organisation, the Law of the Seas Treaty and the International Criminal Court. It shall permit Palestine to claim legal rights over its territorial waters and air space as a sovereign state recognised by the UN. It shall also provide the citizens of Palestine with the right to sue for control of their territory in the International Court of Justice and with the legal right to bring war-crimes charges, mainly those relating to the unlawful Israeli occupation of the State of Palestine, against Israel in the International Criminal Court.

As of 2013, after Palestine was granted UN observer status, the UN authorised the PLO to title its representative office to the UN as 'The Permanent Observer Mission of the State of Palestine to the United Nations', and Palestine has started to re-title its name accordingly on postal stamps, official documents and passports, whilst it has instructed its diplomats to officially represent 'The State of Palestine', as opposed to the 'Palestine National Authority'. Additionally, on 17 December 2012, UN Chief of Protocol Yeocheol Yoon decided that "the designation of 'State of Palestine' shall be used by the Secretariat in all official United Nations documents", thus recognising the PLO-proclaimed State of Palestine as being sovereign over the territories of Palestine and its citizens under international law. Hussein Ibish, senior research fellow, American Task Force on Palestine, mentioned that the terminology that was usually used regarding the Palestinian United Nations application was that the Palestinians seek recognition from the United Nations, which he claims is meaningless, He wrote that: "the United Nations doesn’t recognize states; states recognize each other. The United Nations has member states."

Applications 
Following the 2012 observer state status at the General Assembly, the PLO Executive Committee studied a report including concrete steps on accession to international treaties and joining other international bodies. On 9 January 2013 PLO-EC member Hanan Ashrawi studied steps relevant to joining UN agencies and organizations.

World Health Organization
The PLO currently holds observer status at the World Health Organization (WHO), but applied for full membership status for the State of Palestine in 1989. The United States, which provided one-quarter of the WHO's funding at the time, informed the WHO that its funding would be withheld if Palestine was admitted as a member state. Yasser Arafat described the U.S. statement as "blackmail". The PLO was asked to withdraw its application by the WHO director general. The WHO subsequently voted to postpone consideration of the application and no decision on the application has been made yet. John Quigley writes that Palestine's efforts to gain membership in several international organisations connected to the United Nations was frustrated by U.S. threats to withhold funding from any organisation that admitted Palestine. On 31 October 2011, following the admission of Palestine to UNESCO, the Minister of Health Fathi Abu Moghli announced that the PNA will now seek membership at the WHO. However, following protests by the UN Secretary-General, al-Malki announced on 3 November that at this point the PLO would not seek membership in other UN agencies until the issue of membership has been resolved at the Security Council.

World Trade Organization
In 2005 and 2009, the Palestinian Authority submitted a request for World Trade Organization (WTO) observer status. In 2013 Palestinian private sector representatives proposed that the 1994 agreement about customs union with Israel should be canceled and a separate customs territory administration should be established.

Comprehensive Nuclear-Test-Ban Treaty Organization Preparatory Commission
In 2007, the Palestinian Authority submitted a request for Comprehensive Nuclear-Test-Ban Treaty Organization Preparatory Commission (CTBTO) observer status, but it was declined.

International Criminal Court
In January 2009, the Minister of Justice of the Palestinian Authority (PA), Ali Kashan, expressed the PA's wishes to recognize the jurisdiction of the International Criminal Court (ICC) over "the territory of Palestine" and to invoke Article 12 (3) of the Rome Statute, which specifically enables "a state which is not a party to this Statute" to request that the ICC exercise its jurisdiction on "the territory of Palestine" or involving its nationals.

The ICC rejected the request in April 2012. According to the Jerusalem Post, "had the ICC accepted the PA’s recognition of its jurisdiction, it would have also tacitly accepted its statehood." In September 2012 the ICC prosecutor Fatou Bensouda suggested that the issue may be re-visited following the vote at the UNGA.

United Nations
In September 2011, the PLO submitted an application for full membership of the United Nations.  In a speech to the General Assembly, President Mahmoud Abbas said:
"I would like to inform you that, before delivering this statement, I, in my capacity as President of the State of Palestine and Chairman of the Executive Committee of the Palestine Liberation Organization, submitted to H.E. Ban Ki-moon, Secretary-General of the United Nations an application for the admission of Palestine on the basis of the 4 June 1967 borders, with Al-Kuds Al-Sharif as its capital, as a full member of the United Nations."
In 2011 the Security Council's membership committee deadlocked on the issue and had been "unable to make a unanimous recommendation to the Security Council". Its report was the result of seven weeks of meetings, detailing myriad disagreements between the council members on whether Palestine fulfills the requirements set forth in the U.N. charter for members countries.

Participation in international sports federations

International treaties and conventions 
The Palestine Liberation Organization, representing the Palestinian National Authority, participates in trade liberalisation:

The Palestine Liberation Organization and the Palestinian National Authority are jointly accepted as party to the international agreements in the Arab Mashreq:

Applications 
Following the 2012 UN resolution according observer status for the State of Palestine, foreign minister Maliki stated that a committee will be formed to examine all possible options for the State of Palestine to join international treaties and conventions.

Geneva Conventions
In 1989, the Palestine Liberation Organization, on behalf of the State of Palestine, submitted a letter of accession to the Geneva Conventions. However, Switzerland, as the depositary state, determined that because the question of Palestinian statehood had not been settled within the international community, it was therefore incapable of recognising Palestine as a "power" that could accede to the Conventions.
"Due to the [uncertainty] within the international community as to the existence or the non-existence of a State of Palestine and as long as the issue has not been settled in an appropriate framework, the Swiss Government, in its capacity as depositary of the Geneva Conventions and their additional Protocols, is not in a position to decide whether this communication can be considered as an instrument of accession in the sense of the relevant provisions of the Conventions and their additional Protocols."

Nevertheless, the Palestine Red Crescent Society is currently a member of the International Federation of Red Cross and Red Crescent Societies, which requires its participants to adhere to the Geneva Conventions.

Aftermath of Hamas' victory
After the victory of the Change and Reform list (led by Hamas) in the 2006 elections, many governments, including the United States, as well as the European Union, cut ties with the organs of the PLC, but not those connected to the PNA President, Mahmoud Abbas. The boycott led to the withholding of foreign aid, upon which much of the Palestinian economy is dependent, promised to the PNA. The European Union set up a mechanism to transfer some aid to PNA employees, many of whom had gone unpaid for months, that bypassed the government. After Abbas' sacking of Prime Minister Ismail Haniya as a response by Hamas' takeover of the Gaza Strip in June 2007, the boycott was lifted.

Notes

References

Bibliography

External links
 Ministry of Foreign Affairs
 EU Neighbourhood Info Centre: Country profile of Palestine

 
All pages needing factual verification
State of Palestine